The 2021–22 season is Queen's Park's first season in Scottish League One following their promotion from League Two at the end of the 2020–21 season and their second full season as a professional football club following the repeal of their amateur status. Queen's also competed in the Scottish Cup, League Cup, Challenge Cup and Glasgow Cup.

Summary
On 10 May 2021, following their promotion from League Two, the club announced that manager Ray McKinnon would be stepping down from his position ahead of the new season. 

On 21 May, Queen's assistant coach Laurie Ellis was promoted to the position of first-team head-coach. 

On 3 June, the club announced a groundshare agreement with Partick Thistle to play their home matches at Firhill Stadium while redevelopment work continues at Lesser Hampden.

On 7 June, Queens Park made history by paying their first ever transfer fee to bring former midfielder Liam Brown back to the club from Edinburgh City.

On 15 July, Dempster revealed that Queen's Park would return to home ground Lesser Hampden as early as the end of 2021. 

On 30 November, the club announced the appointment of Marijn Beuker as Director of Football Operations.

On 31 December, head-coach Laurie Ellis and his assistant Grant Murray both left the club after a run of just one win in eight games.

On 18 January 2022, Queen's competed in their first fixture of the renewed Glasgow Cup tournament, which had cancelled the previous two years because of the ongoing pandemic.

On 25 March 2022, Queen's announced the appointment of Owen Coyle as their new head coach who would take up the position from June 1st.

Results and fixtures

Pre-season

Scottish League One

Championship play-off

Scottish League Cup

Group stage
Results

Scottish Challenge Cup

Scottish Cup

Glasgow Cup

Group stage
Results

Knockout phase

Player statistics

|-
|colspan="12"|Players who left the club during the 2021–22 season
|-

|}

Team statistics

League table

League Cup table

Glasgow Cup table

Division summary

Transfers

Players in

Players out

Loans in

Loans out

See also
List of Queen's Park F.C. seasons

References

Queen's Park
Queen's Park F.C. seasons